Vindonius Anatolius of Beirut or Vindonius Anatolius Berytius, also known as Vindanius, Vindanionius, was a Greek author of the 4th century, and may be identical with the praetorian prefect of Illyricum mentioned by Ammianus Marcellinus.

He was the author of a "collection of agricultural practices" based on numerous earlier authors including Julius Africanus, pseudo-Democritus, pseudo-Apuleius, the Quinctilii, Florentinus and Tarentinus. Except for a few fragments, the work of Vindonius is lost. Evidence of its contents includes:

 It was the major source of the 6th-century work of Cassianus Bassus' Eclogae de re rustica, which is also lost but was excerpted in the Geoponica, a surviving 10th-century text.
 Photius included a notice of Vindonius's work in his Bibliotheca (codex 163).
 A Syriac translation was made in the 6th or 7th century, and Arabic and Armenian translations were made from this in the 9th and 10th centuries.
 One page of the original work survives in Bibliothèque Nationale MS B.N.Gr. 2313 f. 49v.

See also
 4th century in Lebanon

Bibliography
H. Beckh, "De Geoponicorum codicibus manuscriptis" in Acta seminarii philologici Erlangensis vol. 4 (1886) pp. 268–70.
E. Fehrle, Richtlinien zur Textgestaltung der griechischen Geoponica. Heidelberg 1920.
John A. C. Greppin, "The Armenians and the Greek Geoponica" in Byzantion vol. 57 (1987) pp. 46–55.
J. F. Habbi, "Testi geoponici classici in siriaco e in arabo" in Autori classici in lingue del vicino e medio oriente ed. G. Fiaccadori (Rome, 1990) pp. 77–92.
A. Paul de Lagarde, Geoponicon in sermonem syriacum versorum quae supersunt. Leipzig: Teubner, 1860.
E. Oder, "Beiträge zur Geschichte der Landwirthschaft bei den Griechen" in Rheinisches Museum vol. 45 (1890) pp. 58–98, 202-22, vol. 48 (1893) pp. 1–40.
R. H. Rodgers, "Hail, Frost, and Pests in the Vineyard: Anatolius of Berytus as a Source for the Nabataean Agriculture" in Journal of the American Oriental Societies vol. 100 (1980) pp. 1–11.
J. L. Teall, "The Byzantine agricultural tradition" in Dumbarton Oaks papers vol. 25 (1971) pp. 35–59.

External links
 R. Rodgers, "Kêpopoiïa: Garden-Making and Garden Culture in the Greek Geoponica," in Byzantine Garden Culture, ed. A. Littlewood et al. (Washington, 2002), pp. 159–175.

Geoponici
Ancient Greek writers
4th-century writers
Writers of lost works